Karla Cristina Martins da Costa (born September 25, 1978) is a Brazilian women's basketball player. She competed internationally for Brazil at the 2004, 2008 Summer Olympics and 2012 Summer Olympics. She is from Brasília.

References

1978 births
Living people
Basketball players at the 2004 Summer Olympics
Basketball players at the 2008 Summer Olympics
Basketball players at the 2012 Summer Olympics
Brazilian expatriate basketball people in Russia
Brazilian expatriate basketball people in Spain
Brazilian women's basketball players
Olympic basketball players of Brazil
Sportspeople from Brasília